Przymiłowice  is a village in the administrative district of Gmina Olsztyn, within Częstochowa County, Silesian Voivodeship, in southern Poland.

The village has a population of 772.

References

Villages in Częstochowa County